Maryland has a long history concerning sports and a number of major and minor professional sport figures have hailed from the state. Maryland enjoys considerable historical repute for the talented sports players of its past, including Cal Ripken Jr., Michael Phelps and Babe Ruth.

 

 Marcus Hatten (born 1980), basketball player, 2006 top scorer in the Israel Basketball Premier League

See also
List of people from Maryland#Athletes
Sports in Maryland
Maryland#Sports

References

Maryland A
Lists of people from Maryland
Maryland sports-related lists